Hypsopygia caesalis is a species of snout moth in the genus Hypsopygia. It was described by Zeller in 1852. It is found in South Africa.

References

Endemic moths of South Africa
Moths described in 1852
Pyralini